The abbreviation ACFC may refer to:

 Atlantic Central Football Conference

It may also refer to one of the following football (soccer) clubs:

 Adama City F.C.
 Adelaide City FC
 Almere City FC
 Angel City FC
 Arema Cronus F.C.
 Armagh City F.C.
 Atherton Collieries F.C.
 Auckland City FC
 Awassa City F.C.